Munthiri kothu is a unique festival sweet from Kanyakumari District, Tamil Nadu, South India. It is also known as paniyaram or payatham urundai in Sri Lanka.

To prepare it, dhall is roasted in a kadai, possibly with a little ghee. This is then cooled and crushed into a fine powder. Sesame seeds and coconut flakes are similarly and separately roasted and powdered. These powders are then combined with cardamom and jaggery syrup. This is then split into marble-sized balls.

A batter consisting of maida flour, rice powder, turmeric and salt is made by adding water carefully to prevent lump formation. A kadai with ghee is heated, and the golf-ball-shaped fritters are deep fried.

References

Tamil cuisine
Indian desserts